This is a list of encyclopedias and encyclopedic/biographical dictionaries published on the subject of aviation and aviators in any language. Entries are in the English language unless specifically stated as otherwise.

See also 
  Bibliography of encyclopedias

Citations

Aviation
Aviation books